Bromhead is an unincorporated community and ghost town in Souris Valley Rural Municipality No. 7, Saskatchewan, Canada.

When Bromhead was first established in 1913, it was a thriving community and one of the biggest stops along the railway. It featured a three-storey hotel, dance hall, blacksmith shop, tailor, department store, cafe, and photo gallery. A fire swept through town in 1916 and it never fully recovered as many residents didn't have insurance or chose to relocate elsewhere. The town, though, didn't completely die then as some of the town did rebuild.

As of 2018, 14 people lived in Bromhead. The local church, Hamar Lutheran, is still open; the post office is still in use; the railway through town, Long Creek Railroad Inc, was bought by locals and put back into service; and the grain elevator is still in use. Most of the buildings, such as the schoolhouse, gas station, houses, and stores are abandoned.

See also 
 List of communities in Saskatchewan
 List of ghost towns in Saskatchewan

References 

Former villages in Saskatchewan
Ghost towns in Saskatchewan
Souris Valley No. 7, Saskatchewan
Unincorporated communities in Saskatchewan
Division No. 2, Saskatchewan